Melissa Jefferson (born 21 February, 2001) is an American track and field sprinter. She attends and competes at Coastal Carolina University.

Jefferson won the Indoor 60m NCAA Championship in 2022.

She won the 100 metres 2022 USA Outdoor Track and Field Championships to qualify for the 2022 World Athletics Championships held in Eugene, Oregon. Jefferson reached the final and finished eighth. She was part of the winning team in the 4 x 100 metres relay.

References

External links
Coastal Carolina Chanticleers bio

2001 births
Living people
World Athletics Championships athletes for the United States
American female sprinters
Coastal Carolina Chanticleers women's track and field athletes
21st-century American women